Abdul Rahman Weiss (born 14 June 1998), also known as Abdul Rahman Oues, is a professional footballer who plays as a right-back for Super League Greece 2 club Athens Kallithea. Born in Greece, he represents the Syria national team.

Weiss is a product of the Panathinaikos and Brentford academies and came to prominence at Platanias. Following more than three years as a professional at the club, he transferred to OFI in 2020. He was capped by Greece at U21 level and Syria at full international level.

Club career

Youth years 
A right-back, Weiss began his career in the academy at Panathinaikos and spent the 2014–15 and 2015–16 seasons with Brentford Griffins, a youth team of English club Brentford. He won two National League U19 Alliance titles with the team.

Platanias 
In 2015, Weiss returned to Greece to join the academy at Platanias and progressed to sign a professional contract in February 2017. He was an unused substitute during a late-2016–17 season Super League match and broke into the team during the 2017–18 relegation season, in which he made 17 appearances. Weiss made 29 appearances and scored one goal during the 2018–19 season and was a part of the team which reached the Football League promotion playoffs. He was nominated for the Best Young Player award at the 2018–19 Football League Awards.

During a 2019–20 season affected by military service and the COVID-19 pandemic, Weiss made 16 appearances and scored one goal, before departing the club on 1 July 2020. He made 62 appearances and scored two goals during four years as a professional at the Perivolia Municipal Stadium.

OFI 
On 8 January 2020, it was announced that Weiss had signed a pre-contract to join Super League club OFI on a four-year contract on 1 July 2020. During a 2020–21 season in which OFI narrowly avoided relegation, he made 34 appearances. During an injury-hit 2021–22 season, Weiss made 12 appearances and departed the club in August 2022. Weiss made 46 appearances during  years at the Theodoros Vardinogiannis Stadium.

Volos 
On 18 August 2022, Weiss signed a two-year contract with Super League club Volos. He made 14 appearances prior to his contract being terminated by mutual consent on 19 January 2023.

Athens Kallithea 
On 20 January 2023, Weiss signed an 18-month contract with Super League Greece 2 club Athens Kallithea. He made two appearances prior to the suspension of the 2022–23 season on 2 February 2023.

International career 
Weiss won five caps for the Greece U21 team and was part of the squad which failed to qualify for the 2021 UEFA European U21 Championship. Weiss made his full international debut for Syria with starts in a pair of 2022 World Cup AFC Third Round qualifiers in September 2021.

Personal life 
Weiss is of Syrian descent. In August 2019, he undertook military service.

Career statistics

Club

International

References

External links 

Abdul Rahman Weiss at Super League Greece

1998 births
Living people
Footballers from Athens
Greek footballers
Syrian footballers
Syrian expatriate footballers
Syria international footballers
Syrian expatriate sportspeople in Greece
Greece under-21 international footballers
Greek people of Syrian descent
Association football fullbacks
Greek expatriate footballers
Greek expatriate sportspeople in England
Expatriate footballers in England
Super League Greece players
Platanias F.C. players
Football League (Greece) players
OFI Crete F.C. players
Volos N.F.C. players
Kallithea F.C. players